Herharaya (alternatively Harhraya, Herhrayya) is a township in the municipality and administrative division of Jdaidet Ghazir – Harharaya – Qattine in the Keserwan District of the   Keserwan-Jbeil Governorate in Lebanon.

The municipality of is a member of Municipal Federation of Kesrouane Al Ftouh.

Notable people 

 Ignatius Ziade (1906–1944), Archbishop of the Maronite Catholic Archeparchy of Aleppo and the Maronite Catholic Archeparchy of Beirut
Philippe Ziade (born 1976), entrepreneur and honorary consul in Nevada

References.

Bibliography 

 
 

Populated places in Keserwan District
Maronite Christian communities in Lebanon
Melkite Christian communities in Lebanon